is a railway station in the city of Hirosaki, Aomori Prefecture, Japan, operated by the private railway operator, Kōnan Railway Company. It is located in front of Hirosaki Gakuin University.

Lines
Hirosakigakuindaimae Station is served by the Kōnan Railway Ōwani Line, and lies 12.0 kilometers from the southern terminus of the line at Ōwani Station.

Station layout
The station has one island platform connected to the station building by a level crossing. The station is unattended.

Platforms

Adjacent stations

History
On December 1, 1971 the first automatic ticket machines on the Kōnan Railway were installed at this station. It became a kan'i itaku station on October 1, 1985. The station name was changed to its present name on September 1, 2008. The station has been unattended since April 1, 2009.

Surrounding area
Hirosaki University
Hirosaki Gakuin University
Tohoku Women's College

See also
 List of railway stations in Japan

External links

Kōnan Railway home page 
 Location map 

Railway stations in Aomori Prefecture
Konan Railway
Hirosaki
Railway stations in Japan opened in 1952